Euxoa septentrionalis is a species of cutworm or dart moth in the family Noctuidae. It is found in North America.

The MONA or Hodges number for Euxoa septentrionalis is 10739.

References

Further reading

External links

 

Euxoa
Articles created by Qbugbot
Moths described in 1865